Monasterio de la Victoria is a former monastery located in El Puerto de Santa María, province of Cádiz, southern Spain. It was built in the 16th century by Dukes of Medinaceli. The buildings housed a prison between 1886 and 1981. 

During the Second Spanish Republic, the  Civil War and  Franco's Dictatorship, the Monastery was used as a prison. During and after the civil war, it housed political prisoners such as Ramón Rubial, then president of the  Socialist Party and Eleuterio Sánchez, AKA el Lute.

References

See also 

 List of Bienes de Interés Cultural in Cádiz

Buildings and structures in El Puerto de Santa María
Victory
Defunct prisons in Spain
16th-century Roman Catholic church buildings in Spain
Bien de Interés Cultural landmarks in the Province of Cádiz
Christian monasteries established in the 16th century